Mohammed Bin Dabbas is a paralympic athlete from United Arab Emirates competing mainly in category F34 throws events.

Mohammed competed in the discus in both the 2000 and 2004 Summer Paralympics, winning the bronze medal in the 2004 games.  He also competed in the 2008 Summer Paralympics in Beijing in the discus, shot and javelin but was unable to win a medal.

References

Paralympic athletes of the United Arab Emirates
Athletes (track and field) at the 2000 Summer Paralympics
Athletes (track and field) at the 2004 Summer Paralympics
Athletes (track and field) at the 2008 Summer Paralympics
Paralympic bronze medalists for the United Arab Emirates
Living people
Medalists at the 2004 Summer Paralympics
Year of birth missing (living people)
Paralympic medalists in athletics (track and field)
Emirati male discus throwers